A desire line is a synonym to "desire path", a path created by erosion caused by human or animal foot traffic. 

Desire line or Desire Lines may also refer to:

Literature
Desire Lines (1992), a drama by Michael Gurr
Desire Lines (1997), a book by Jack Gantos
Desire Lines (1999) by Christina Baker Kline
Desire Lines (2004), by David R. Ross
Desire Lines (2004), a collection of poems by Lola Haskins
Desire Lines (2013), a short story collection by Mary Soderstrom
 "The Desire Lines", a science fiction story by Karl Schroeder from METAtropolis

Music
Desire Lines, a Camera Obscura album
 "Desire Lines", a  Deerhunter song from Halcyon Digest
 "Desire Lines", a track from  Split (Lush album)
 "Desire Lines", a track from Ghosts (Cowboy Junkies album)
 "Desire Lines", a track from The Violence (album)